John Nelson Chiasson from the Boise State University, Boise, ID was named Fellow of the Institute of Electrical and Electronics Engineers (IEEE) in 2012 for contributions to control of electric machines and power converters.

References

Fellow Members of the IEEE
Living people
Year of birth missing (living people)
Place of birth missing (living people)
Boise State University faculty
American electrical engineers